Yarbaşı is a village in the Pülümür District, Tunceli Province, Turkey. The village is populated by Kurds of Balaban tribe and had a population of 35 in 2021.

The hamlets of Aktekin, Barışlı, Bayramlı, Bozağaç, Burgulu, Dolubakraç, Döldere, Esmecik, İmrendi, Özbaşı and Taşyuva are attached to the village.

References 

Kurdish settlements in Tunceli Province
Villages in Pülümür District